The 2016 St. Francis Brooklyn Terriers men's soccer team represented St. Francis College during the 2016 NCAA Division I men's soccer season. The Terrier's home games were played at Brooklyn Bridge Park, Pier 5. The team has been a member of the Northeast Conference since 1981 and was coached by Tom Giovatto, who was in his tenth year at the helm of the Terriers.

The Terriers ended their season at 12–5–3 overall and  6–0–1 in conference play. The Terriers won the NEC Regular season championship and the Tournament Championship. Of note, the Terriers ended the season seventh in the country in goals against average (0.60) and shutout percentage (0.55).

Regular season
The Terriers opened their season at Lafayette, winning in double-overtime 1–0 on a goal by sophomore Djiby Sarr. Due to his golden goal, Sarr was named NEC Soccer Player of the Week. The Terriers then proceeded to lose three games in a row to Rhode Island, UMass Lowell, and Hartford. The Terriers then tied Hartwick 1–1, defeated NJIT, 2–1, in double overtime and came up with a 1–1 draw versus Army. St. Francis Brooklyn defender Faouzi Taieb scored his first goal as a Terrier in the 66th minute of their 2–1 win over NJIT, and was named the Northeast Conference Rookie of the Week. With a 2–3–2 record, the Terriers then went on to defeat Saint Peter's and Howard. Since going undefeated in their last five games and winning two in a row, the Terriers were ranked 10th in the NSCAA North East Region week 5 rankings. In their last non-conference match-up, the Terriers lost to George Washington to snap their five-game undefeated streak and bring their record to 4–4–2. For their non-conference games the Terriers displayed a clear home-field advantage by posting a 3–1–1 record, while posting a 1–3–1 record on the road.

The Terriers started league play by defeating Sacred Heart on the road 2–0. The Terriers then proceeded to go undefeated through conference play and finished 6–0–1. During their seven-game undefeated streak, the Terriers also shutout every team faced, by not allowing a goal. Going into their last game of the season the Terriers were leading the conference standings and faced a winner-take-all match against LIU Brooklyn, as they did in 2015. If the Terriers lost they would tie LIU Brooklyn in the standings, but LIU would have the tie-breaker in the win. Instead the St. Francis men’s soccer team won 1–0 over rival LIU at home, wrapping up the program’s first regular-season conference title since 1997. By virtue of the win, the top-seeded Terriers (10–4–3, 6–0–1) will host the conference tournament, opening with a match against No. 4 Sacred Heart on Nov. 11. St. Francis has a shot at its third Northeast Conference title in four years.

After the regular season ended, St. Francis Brooklyn set a program record by having eight different players awarded NEC men's soccer honors. St. Francis Brooklyn claimed three of the four major awards presented by the NEC. Senior defender Collyns Laokandi was named the NEC Defensive Player of the Year and freshman defender Faouzi Taieb collected NEC Rookie of the Year honors. Head coach Tom Giovatto was named the NEC Coach of the Year after leading the Terriers to their first NEC regular season title in 18 years.

NEC Tournament
For the third time in four seasons, the St. Francis Terriers' men's soccer team is returning to the Northeast Conference Championship, thanks to NEC First Team All-Conference forward Salvatore Barone who scored in the 78th minute on an assist by fellow First Teamer Dominick Falanga. The Terriers held on to defeat third seed Sacred Heart at home, 1–0, in the semifinal game. In the championship game, the Terriers won 1–0 against Saint Francis (PA) in double overtime on a Lukas Hauer penalty kick.

NCAA tournament
The Terriers traveled to Hanover, New Hampshire to face the Dartmouth Big Green in the first round of the NCAA Tournament. The Terriers have played against Dartmouth on two other occasions, with the all-time record at 1–1. St. Francis Brooklyn lost in the 104 minute on a golden goal by Dartmouth. Goalie Seth Erdman had a game high eight saves, as he held off the Big Green through the two regulation periods and one overtime period, but gave up the game-winner in double overtime. For the Terriers, it was the first goal they've surrendered in 982 minutes.

2016 squad
As of August 24, 2016.

Captains in bold

Schedule 

|-
!colspan=12 style="background:#0038A8; border: 2px solid #CE1126;color:#FFFFFF;"| Non-Conference Regular Season
|-

|-
!colspan=12 style="background:#0038A8; border: 2px solid #CE1126;color:#FFFFFF;"| Northeast Conference Regular Season
|-

|-
!colspan=12 style="background:#0038A8; border: 2px solid #CE1126;color:#FFFFFF;"| Northeast Conference Tournament
|-

|-
!colspan=12 style="background:#0038A8; border: 2px solid #CE1126;color:#FFFFFF;"| NCAA Division I Men's Soccer Championship
|-

|-

2016 NSCAA/Continental Tire College rankings

Awards

Djiby Sarr, Sophomore Midfielder
NEC Player of the Week Award (August 22, 2016 – August 28, 2016)
Selected to the 2016 NEC All-Rookie Team

Faouzi Taieb, Freshman Defender  
NEC Rookie of the Week Award (September 12, 2016 – September 18, 2016)
Selected the 2016 NEC Rookie of the Year
Selected to the 2016 NEC All-Rookie Team

Yussuf Olajide, Senior Forward  
NEC Player of the Week Award (September 19, 2016 – September 25, 2016)
Selected to the 2016 NEC Second Team All-Conference
2016 NSCAA NCAA Division I Men's All-Northeast Region Second Team

Dominick Falanga, Junior Midfielder  
NEC Player of the Week Award (October 3, 2016 – October 9, 2016)
Selected to the 2016 NEC First Team All-Conference
2016 ECAC Division I honorable mention
2016 NSCAA NCAA Division I Men's All-Northeast Region Second Team

Salvatore Barone, Senior Midfielder  
NEC Player of the Week Award (October 10, 2016 – October 16, 2016)
Selected to the 2016 NEC First Team All-Conference
2016 NEC Tournament MVP
2016 ECAC Division I honorable mention

Collyns Laokandi, Senior Defender
2016 NEC Defender of the Year
Selected to the 2016 NEC First Team All-Conference
2016 ECAC Division I Defensive Player of the Year
2016 NSCAA NCAA Division I Men's All-Northeast Region First Team

Robert Bazzichetto, Junior Goalkeeper
Selected to the 2016 NEC First Team All-Conference
Selected to the 2016 ECAC Division I All-Star Team

Fabian Suele, Senior Midfielder
Selected to the 2016 NEC Second Team All-Conference

Season statistics

See also 

 St. Francis Brooklyn Terriers men's soccer
 2016 NCAA Division I men's soccer season
 Northeast Conference Men's Soccer Tournament
 2016 NCAA Division I Men's Soccer Championship

References 

St. Francis Brooklyn Terriers
St. Francis Brooklyn Terriers men's soccer seasons
St. Francis Brooklyn Terriers
St. Francis Brooklyn Terriers